"Disco Romancing" is a song by Romanian artist Elena Gheorghe. It is her sixth single to be released and the first since her Eurovision Song Contest entry, in 2009. With "Disco Romancing", Gheorghe tries a new musical style, house, a very successful musical style in Romania, and, because of Romanian artists such as Inna and Edward Maya, worldwide. The song was written by Laurenţiu Duţă (ex- 3 Sud Est) and Ovidiu Bistriceanu, and was produced by Duţă. They also wrote and produced "The Balkan Girls" for Elena. The song leaked on the Internet in mid-April 2010 and was confirmed as Elena's future single in early May. The music video was filmed in May 2010 and the main set was the A2 motorway, on the way to the Black Sea. The director of the video is Dragoş Buliga. "Disco Romancing" debuted at number 74 in the Romanian Top 100 and later became Gheorghe's second  number one in the chart. With this feat, she became the first Romanian female artist to top the chart twice. It has also charted in Ukraine, Russia, Bulgaria and Hungary.

Background 
"Disco Romancing" is an up-tempo song, the musical style is house, with minimal and euro-dance influences. It was written by Laurenţiu Duţă and Ovidiu Bistriceanu and produced by Duţă. It consists in two verses and a three-time-repeated chorus. It has also two Italian references - "Every Boy goes to Roma" and "Every Boy says <Ti Amo>".

Music video
The music video was shot in May 2010 on the A2 Motorway of Romania and in a gas station near Medgidia. It was directed by Dragoş Buliga and features Elena and three back-up dancers. Some of the ideas belong to Elena. The video starts with her and two dancers wearing military-like clothes in a car driven by Elena. They stop somewhere on the motorway to take Elena some pictures. She wears a dress made-up only by pictures of herself. Then Elena is shown in a Zorbing ball, holding a doll. In the end, Elena and three back up dancers are doing a choreography in front of a gas station by night. The video lasts 3 minutes 13 seconds and premiered on YouTube, on May 31, 2010, and at the TV station Kiss TV on June 1. The high-definition video premiered on U TV HD in mid-June 2010. On YouTube, the video gained over 5,000,000 views as of January 2011.

Chart performance 
"Disco Romancing" debuted at number 74 in the Romanian Top 100, on April 25, 2010. A few weeks later it reached number 25, becoming Elena's sixth consecutive top-25 hit in Romania. On July 31, the song  entered the top 10. On September 19, 2010, "Disco Romancing" became Elena's second consecutive release to reach number-one, after "The Balkan Girls". It has stayed in the top of the chart for a month (4 weeks) and it has spent a total of 13 weeks in the top 10. At the year-end chart, it became the fourteenth song of the year with 8,796 airings, behind Lady Gaga's "Bad Romance". The song managed to peak at number-three in the Hungarian Dance Chart, on January 10, 2011, in its 11th week in the top forty."Disco Romancing" was released as an EP via iTunes in the United States, on December 6. The song has also hit the bubbling-under chart of the UK Singles Chart, at number 99 (#199 in the complete Top 200), in August 2010. It has remained in the chart for just one week. The song has also charted in Bulgaria, Russia and Ukraine.
In France and Spain the single was out in early February 2011, via iTunes.

Live performance 
The first ever performance of the song was on "Liber la Vacanta" a Romanian TV show, where the music video premiered.
Elena performed "Disco Romancing" at "Neatza cu Razvan si Dani" and "Acces Direct" (Antena 1 shows) and at the "Bucharest Days". She has performed it on the New Year coverage of Pro TV. The variation of the song for the live performances was adapted to Elena's former style - more Latino, with some merengue beats. The song was also covered and performed by Inna during her 2011 French tour INNA en Concert.

Charts

See also 
 List of Romanian Top 100 number ones of the 2010s

References 

2010 singles
Number-one singles in Romania
Elena Gheorghe songs
2010 songs
Songs written by Ovi Bistriceanu